Kewa Pueblo (Eastern Keres , Keres: Díiwʾi, Navajo: Tó Hájiiloh) is a federally-recognized tribe of Native American Pueblo people in northern New Mexico, in Sandoval County southwest of Santa Fe. The pueblo is recorded as the Santo Domingo Pueblo census-designated place by the U.S. Census Bureau, with a population of 2,456 at the 2010 census.

The population of the pueblo is composed of Native Americans who speak Keres, an eastern dialect of the Keresan languages. Like several other Pueblo peoples, they have a matrilineal kinship system, in which children are considered born into the mother's family and clan, and inheritance and property pass through the maternal line. The pueblo celebrates an annual feast day on August 4 to honor their patron saint, Saint Dominic. More than 2,000 pueblo people participate in the traditional corn dances held at this time.

Name
In the 17th century, the Spanish conquistadores named the pueblo "Santo Domingo". Its earliest recorded name was Gipuy. According to Pueblo Council members, the local name in their Keres language has always been Kewa. In 2009, the pueblo officially changed its name to Kewa Pueblo, altering its seal, signs and letterhead.

According to the Pueblo of Acoma's Keres Online Dictionary, the Western Keresan-name for the pueblo was Díiwʾi and for its people therefore Dîiwʾamʾé.

Geography
Kewa Pueblo is located at  (35.514483, -106.363429). Interstate 25 runs  to the east of the community. The pueblo is part of the Albuquerque Metropolitan Statistical Area.

Demographics

The 2010 census found that 2,456 people lived in the CDP, while 3,519 people in the U.S. reported being exclusively Santo Domingo Puebloan and 4,430 people reported being Santo Domingo Puebloan exclusively or in combination with another group.

The state of New Mexico has reported the population as 3,100.

History

The pueblo plays a supporting role in Spanish colonial history. Gaspar Castaño de Sosa, a fugitive from the Crown, was arrested at the pueblo in March 1591. Castaño, a notorious slaver, had fled capture. He pursued an illegal claims expedition up the Pecos River, which had not yet been seen by Europeans. He made it as far as Pecos Pueblo, and raided it for slaves. He turned west and traveled toward modern-day Santa Fe, which had been established by the Spanish. He followed the Rio Grande river valley south. On orders of the Viceroy at Mexico City, Captain Juan Morlette found Castaño at Kewa Pueblo and arrested him. He returned him to authorities to face trial for his crimes, including his attack on Pecos Pueblo.

Castaño abandoned two interpreters at Kewa Pueblo; he had kidnapped them earlier and brought them with him. Governor Juan de Oñate's expedition recorded encountering Tomas and Cristobal at Kewa Pueblo, as it traveled north.

20th century to present

Potters of Kewa and Cochiti Pueblos have made stylized pottery for centuries, developing styles for different purposes and expressing deep beliefs in their designs. Since the early decades of the 20th century, these pots have been appreciated by a wider audience outside the pueblos. Continuing to use traditional techniques, in the late 20th and early 21st centuries, potters have also expanded their designs and repertoire in pottery, which has an international market.

Visual arts 
Kewa artists are known for their stonework jewelry, including flat disks or beads called heishi, meaning "shell bead" in Eastern Keresan, which are often made into necklaces.

Pottery 
Pottery is an important art form and utilitarian craft from Kewa Pueblo. Large ollas and dough bowls are common forms for Kewa potters. Many Kewa potters are women, although men can also create ceramics.

The Aguilar Family, consisting of two sisters and one sister-in-law, created Kewa pottery from 1910 until approximately 1915 and became very well-known for their artwork.

Robert Tenorio has continued his family legacy by making traditional Kewa pottery, and Tenorio's sister was part of a well-known husband-wife pottery collaboration called, Arthur and Hilda Coriz.

Education
It is in the Bernalillo Public Schools district, which operates Santo Domingo Elementary and Middle Schools, and Bernalillo High School.

The school district states that Cochiti Elementary and Middle Schools in Peña Blanca and Bernalillo Middle School have students from Kewa Pueblo. Bernalillo Middle School (a zoned middle school of this community), Some elementary-aged students from Kewa Pueblo attend Algodones Elementary School in Algodones.

Notable people

Notes

Further reading
 Chapman, Kenneth Milton (1977). The Pottery of Santo Domingo Pueblo: A Detailed Study of Its Decoration. School of American Research, University of New Mexico Press, Albuquerque, New Mexico, ; original published in 1936 as volume 1 of the Memoirs of the Laboratory of Anthropology 
 Richard H. Frost, The Railroad and the Pueblo Indians: The Impact of the Atchison, Topeka and Santa fe on the Pueblos of the Rio Grande, 1880-1930. 2016, Salt Lake City: University of Utah Press. 
 Verzuh, Valerie K. (2008). A River Apart: The Pottery of Cochiti and Santo Domingo Pueblos. Museum of New Mexico Press, Santa Fe, New Mexico,

External links
 Santo Domingo Pueblo
 Keres Pueblo Indians – Encyclopedia of World Cultures

Native American tribes in New Mexico
Census-designated places in New Mexico
Albuquerque metropolitan area
Kewa Pueblo, New Mexico